HMS Lassoo  was a  built for the Royal Navy during the 1910s.

Description
The Laforey class were improved and faster versions of the preceding . They displaced . Lassoo was powered by two Parsons direct-drive steam turbines, each driving one propeller shaft, using steam provided by four Yarrow boilers. The ships' complement was 74 officers and ratings.

The ships were armed with three single QF  Mark IV guns and two QF 1.5-pounder (37 mm) anti-aircraft guns. These latter guns were later replaced by a pair of QF 2-pounder (40 mm) "pom-pom" anti-aircraft guns. The ships were also fitted with two above-water twin mounts for  torpedoes.

Construction and service
She was built during the First World War as part of an emergency program of naval construction, to an Admiralty design by William Beardmore & Company, Dalmuir. She was originally to have been named Magic but she was renamed Lassoo on 15 February 1915 before being launched on 24 August 1915. She was sunk by the German U-boat  on 13 August 1916 off the Maas lightship in the North Sea.

Notes

Bibliography
 
 
 
 

 

Laforey-class destroyers (1913)
Ships built on the River Clyde
1915 ships
World War I destroyers of the United Kingdom
Ships sunk by German submarines in World War I
World War I shipwrecks in the North Sea
Maritime incidents in 1916